LIAT operates scheduled services to the following destinations:

List

Former destinations
Curaçao
Willemstad, Curaçao International Airport
Venezuela
Caracas, Simón Bolívar International Airport
Saint Vincent and the Grenadines
Kingstown - E. T. Joshua Airport flights transferred to Argyle International Airport
Charlestown - Canouan Airport
United States Virgin Islands
Saint Croix - Henry E. Rohlsen Airport
Montserrat
W H Bramble Airport

References

Lists of airline destinations